Along the posterior part of the lateral margin of the carotid groove of the sphenoid bone, in the angle between the body and great wing, is a ridge of bone, called the lingula.

References

External links
 

Bones of the head and neck